Helmet, also known as Black Swan, and originally as Mada 9, is an economic sport car prototype engineered by Mohammad Raza Ahmadi and produced by the Entop in Afghanistan. It was shown to the public at Kabul University in late 2022, and its designers hope that it will make appearance at the Geneva International Motor Show sometime in the future. The Mada 9 currently runs on a Modified 1.8 L 1ZZ-FE I4 engine. The exotic car was developed in more than five years by Ahmadi and his team in the workshop at Afghanistan Technical Vocational Institute (ATVI).

References

External links 
 (Al Jazeera English, Jan 23, 2023)
 (Ariana News, Jan. 18, 2023)

Sports cars
Cars introduced in 2022